James Lent Barclay (October 5, 1848 – July 2, 1925) was a prominent American member of New York society during the Gilded Age.

Early life
Barclay was born on October 5, 1848 in Newtown on Long Island.  He was the third child and second son of four children born to Henry Barclay (1794–1863) and Sarah Ann Moore (1809–1873).  His siblings were Henry Anthony Barclay (1844–1905), Fannie Barclay (1846–1922), and Sackett Moore Barclay (1850–1918).

His maternal grandfather was Daniel Sackett Moore. His paternal great oncle is Thomas Henry Barclay (1753–1830).

Career
Barclay attended Columbia University. He is recorded as matriculating with the class of 1870, but it is unsure if he finished the degree. He was president of the Barclay Realty Company which was located at 299 Broadway in Manhattan. The company managed his family's extensive real estate holdings, generally located near Barclay Street, named for his ancestors.

Society life
In 1892, both Barclay and his wife Olivia were included in Ward McAllister's "Four Hundred", purported to be an index of New York's best families, published in The New York Times. Conveniently, 400 was the number of people that could fit into Mrs. Astor's ballroom.

He was a member of the Union Club, of which he was a governor, Shinnecock Hills Golf Club, Meadow Brook Golf Club, and the Southampton Club.

Personal life
Barclay was married to Olivia Mott Bell (1855–1894). She was the daughter of Isaac Bell and Adelaide (née Mott) Bell, and the sister of Isaac Bell Jr. (1846–1889), the businessman and diplomat. Before her death, they were the parents of one daughter:

 Adelaide Mott Barclay (b. 1884), who married Algernon "Algy" K. Boyesen (b. 1880), a dramatist who was part of the Lafayette Flying Corps and was the son of Hjalmar Hjorth Boyesen, in 1903. She later married Carlos G. Mayer.  Adelaide was the mother of Olivia Barclay Boyesen, who married Dudley William Persse (1901–1976) of the Royal Artillery in 1928, and Allardyce Barclay Boyesen, who married Philippe Hottinguer, the son of Baron Henri Hottinguer, in 1931.

After the death of his first wife in 1894, he married Priscilla Palmer Dixon (1851–1924), the widow of Thomas Chalmers Sloane (1847–1890) of the W. & J. Sloane Company, on April 16, 1896 at her home on West 51st Street in Manhattan.  She was the daughter of Courtlandt Palmer Dixon (1817–1883) and Hannah Elizabeth (née Williams) Dixon (1817–1888), a cousin of U.S. Representative and Senator Nathan F. Dixon III, a niece of Nathan F. Dixon II, and a granddaughter of U.S. Senator Nathan Fellows Dixon.

Barclay died at his home, 15 West 48th Street in New York on July 2, 1925.  He was buried at Woodlawn Cemetery in the Bronx.

Residence
Barclays owned a six-acre estate in Southampton, New York with a 13,000 square foot Colonial Revival home. The home was later owned by producer Martin Richards and Mary Lea Johnson Richards.

References

External links
 

1848 births
1925 deaths
Schuyler family
Van Cortlandt family
Businesspeople from Queens, New York
American people of Dutch descent
People included in New York Society's Four Hundred
People from Elmhurst, Queens
Columbia College (New York) alumni